Lake Tolken is the source of the Swedish river Viskan. It is located west of Ulricehamn.

References 

Lakes of Västra Götaland County